Royal Rosheam Harbor (born May 12, 1975), more commonly known by the stage name , is an American rapper.
Knoc-turn'al was introduced to the world 2000 on Dr. Dre's multiplatinum album 2001

Career
Knoc-turn'al was introduced to the world 2000 on Dr. Dre's multiplatinum album 2001, he shined on the songs "Some L.A. Niggaz" and "Bang Bang". Knoc-turn'al also penned some of the verses for the album. Legendary producer Dr. Dre then featured Knoc-turn'al on the Dr. Dre classic single and video "Bad Intentions" for the movie soundtrack "The Wash". Knoc-turn'al's song "Str8 West Coast" also appears on "The Wash". Knoc-turn'al then went on to release a song produced by Kanye West "Muzik" which was the lead single for the motion picture "Trainspotter". "Muzik" went on to become Kanye West 1st hit. The single was also included on the EP L.A. Confidential presents: Knoc-turn'al. Knoc-turn'al received a grammy nomination for the song "The Knoc" featuring Missy Elliot, and Dr. Dre that was also on the EP. The song and video was critically acclaimed and broke into the top 100 on the Billboard charts. Knoc-turn'al's official debut album, The Way I Am, which featured production from Dr. Dre, Dj Quik, BattleCat, Scott Storch and Timberland went on to make a mark on the charts. Knoc-turn'al's break out single "The Way I Am" featured Snoop Dogg and was produced by Scott Storch. "The Way I Am" album also featured appearances from Xzibit, Nate Dogg, Warren G, Slip Capone and others. After an hiatus Knoc-turn'al signed on to Executive Produce movie soundtracks for the Film Company Mayhem Films. With a multi project deal, he's overseen the "Snow Black" movie soundtrack and the "Mad As Hell Soundtrack. Knoc-turn'al is slated to drop movie soundtracks with the Mayhem Films into 2025. Knoc-turn'al has returned with his third project. The EP "Knight Vizion" was released November 2022 on Jubeeeco Entertainment. "Knight Vizion" features Joe Moses, Kxng Crooked, Ms. Toi, Slink Johnson (Lamar from Grand Theft Auto) and Meezy Mays. The first video from "Knight Vizion" by Knoc-turn'al features recording artist "Meezy Mays" and is filmed by Tony Corrella.

Singles
Harbor has released three singles, "The Knoc" featuring Missy Elliott and Dr. Dre (who also produced it), and his second was "Muzik" featuring Samuel Christian and produced by Kanye West. The third single was "The Way I Am" featuring Snoop Dogg and produced by Scott Storch. The forthcoming single off his next album will be entitled "Ya Boy Is Back" and is produced by Scott Storch.

Label
Despite having close ties with Dr. Dre, he signed with Elektra Records which offered him his own label: L.A. Confidential. He has released some albums but has never reached the mainstream. His single "The Way I Am" has seen moderate airplay.

Discography

Albums

Studio albums
 
"Knight Vizion"
 Released: November 1, 2022
 Label: Jubeeeco Entertainment
 Format: Digital Download

Extended plays
Super Bowl champion 1974

Mixtapes
 1-11-11: The Prequel (2010)

Singles

As lead artist

As featured performer

Guest Appearances

References

External links

Treacherous Records official website

1975 births
21st-century American rappers
African-American male rappers
African-American male singer-songwriters
Gangsta rappers
G-funk artists
Living people
People from Long Beach, California
Rappers from Los Angeles
21st-century African-American male singers
Singer-songwriters from California